Irby-Henderson-Todd House is a historic home located at Laurens, Laurens County, South Carolina. It was built about 1838 and was enlarged in both 1855 and 1880, and displays an architectural evolution from an antebellum farmhouse to a Classical Revival mansion with later Victorian details.  Distinctive features include the two-story pedimented portico. Also on the property is a 19th-century well house (smokehouse).

It was added to the National Register of Historic Places in 1983.

References

Houses on the National Register of Historic Places in South Carolina
Neoclassical architecture in South Carolina
Houses completed in 1838
Houses in Laurens County, South Carolina
National Register of Historic Places in Laurens County, South Carolina